The Historic Chinatown Gate is a modern Paifang archway in the Chinatown-International District neighborhood of Seattle, Washington.

Description and history 
The  archway is located over South King Street east of 5th Avenue South and the International District/Chinatown light rail station, marking the west end of the Chinatown neighborhood. The gate, designed by Paul Wu and Ming Zhang of MulvannyG2 Architecture of Bellevue, Washington, was built over a period of several months in late 2007 and is composed of a steel structure and ceramic ornaments, including 8,000 ceramic tiles made in southern China. The $500,000 construction cost was paid for by the Historic Chinatown Gate Foundation, a non-profit organization established in 1999 to build the archway. The Historic Chinatown Gate was dedicated on February 9, 2008, during a ceremony attended by local officials, including Seattle mayor Greg Nickels and Governor Christine Gregoire.

Plans for a second gate at the eastern end of the district, to be located on South King Street at either 8th Avenue South or at 12th Avenue South in Little Saigon and estimated to cost $800,000, have been on hold since 2010.

See also
 2008 in art
 History of Chinese Americans in Seattle

References

External links
 

2008 establishments in Washington (state)
2008 sculptures
Buildings and structures in Seattle
Ceramic sculptures in the United States
Chinatown–International District, Seattle
Chinese-American culture in Seattle
Gates in the United States
Steel sculptures in Washington (state)